Colonus puerperus is a species of jumping spider commonly found in the eastern United States. Its range stretches along the Gulf Coast from Florida to Texas, and north to Kansas, Illinois, and Pennsylvania. It is usually found in grassy areas during the warmer months of the year. Adult females are between 7 and 11 mm (0.3–0.4 in) in length. Adult males are between 5 and 7 mm (0.2–0.3 in).

References

External links

Colonus puerperus at Bugguide.net

Salticidae
Spiders of the United States
Spiders described in 1846